Glyphipterix euastera is a species of sedge moth in the genus Glyphipterix. It is endemic to New Zealand. This species is classified as "At Risk, Naturally Uncommon" by the Department of Conservation.

Taxonomy
This species was described by Edward Meyrick in 1880 using five specimens taken by him in January on the Lyttleton Hills near Christchurch. George Hudson discussed and illustrated the species in his 1928 book The Butterflies and Moths of New Zealand. The lectotype specimen is held at the Natural History Museum, London.

Description
Meyrick described the species as follows:

Distribution
This species is endemic to New Zealand. This species occurs in the Mid Canterbury, Central Otago and Otago Lakes areas. Other than the type locality, which is like to be either the Bridle or Rapaki Track, specimens have been collected at Kaitorete Spit, the Hinewai Reserve and near Sutton Lake in Otago. The species also occurs at the north side of Lake Forsyth as well as at Wakanui Beach.

Biology and behaviour
G. euastera is a day-flying moth. This species is on the wing between October and January. It is a leaf mining moth.

Host plants and habitat

The host species of the larvae of G. euastera is unknown although it is likely that it is a sedge or grass. It is believed that the species is associated with Poa Cita (silver tussock).

Conservation status
This species has been classified as having the "At Risk, Naturally Uncommon" conservation status under the New Zealand Threat Classification System. This species is at risk as a result of habitat destruction or modification.

References

endangered biota of New Zealand
endemic fauna of New Zealand
Glyphipterigidae
moths described in 1880
moths of New Zealand
taxa named by Edward Meyrick
Endemic moths of New Zealand